Artis may refer to:

People

Surname
 Dominic Artis (born 1993), American basketball player
 Edmund Tyrell Artis (1789–1847), English archaeologist, palaebotanist, and geologist
 Jamareo Artis (born 1989), American bass guitarist
 Jamel Artis (born 1993), American basketball player
 Orsten Artis (1943–2017), American basketball player
 Rebecca Artis (born 1988), Australian professional golfer
 William Artis (1914–1977), American sculptor

Given name
 Artis Ābols (born 1973), Latvian ice hockey player and coach
 Artis Ate (born 1989), Latvian basketball player
 Artis Gilmore (born 1949), American basketball player
 Artis Ivey Jr. or Coolio (1963–2022), American rapper, actor, chef, and record producer
 Artis Kampars (born 1967), Latvian politician and businessman
 Artis Lazdiņš (born 1986), Latvian footballer 
 Artis Lane (born 1927), Canadian sculptor and painter
 Artis Pabriks (born 1966), Latvian politician
 Artis Rasmanis (born 1971), Latvian sidecarcross passenger

Stage name
 Artis the Spoonman (born 1948), American street performer from Seattle
Kon Artis, a stage name of Denaun Porter (born 1978), American rapper, singer, songwriter, and record producer

Other uses
 Artis (non-profit company), a non-profit art organization based in New York City
 Artis, LLC, a research company in Herndon, Virginia
 Artis Award, a Québécois television award
 Artis Library, Amsterdam
 Natura Artis Magistra, a zoo in Amsterdam

See also
 Ars Gratia Artis, a Latin phrase meaning art for art's sake
 Arti (disambiguation)
 Cameron Artis-Payne (born 1990), American football running back
 

Latvian masculine given names